Bruce Craig Gregory (22 April 1937 – 29 October 2015) was a New Zealand politician of the Labour Party.

Early life and career 
Gregory was born in Kaingaroa in Northland to parents Vivian Lauder Gregory (Ngāi Tahu) and Tai Te Maru (Te Rarawa). He was educated at Pukepoto Native School, Kaitaia College and the University of Otago. He graduated with a Bachelor of Medicine and Bachelor of Surgery and practised medicine in Thames and Kaitaia. Notably, he was the first Māori general practitioner to work in Kaitaia.

He maintained an interest throughout his life in Māori art and musical instruments.

Political career

Rata contested the by-election for the Mana Motuhake party but, ultimately, Gregory was successful. He was successful in each subsequent general election until 1993, when Tau Henare won Northern Maori for New Zealand First.

In 1983 he was appointed as Labour's spokesperson for Arts & Culture in the Lange shadow Cabinet. He was not appointed a minister in the Fourth Labour Government. In 1990 he became Labour's spokesperson for Lands in the Moore shadow Cabinet.

Upon his defeat at the 1993 general election, Gregory returned to Kaitaia and continued his work in Māori health.

Death
Gregory died on 29 October 2015.

Notes

References

1937 births
New Zealand Labour Party MPs
New Zealand MPs for Māori electorates
Members of the New Zealand House of Representatives
2015 deaths
Unsuccessful candidates in the 1993 New Zealand general election